Tian Qin (born August 30, 1983 in Hunan) is a Chinese slalom canoeist who competed in the 2000s. He finished 11th in the C2 event at the 2004 Summer Olympics in Athens, Greece after being eliminated in the qualifying round.

World Cup individual podiums

1 Asia Canoe Slalom Championship counting for World Cup points

References

1983 births
Canoeists at the 2004 Summer Olympics
Chinese male canoeists
Living people
Olympic canoeists of China
Sportspeople from Hunan